Hamilton Viewpoint is a  public park in the West Seattle neighborhood of Seattle, Washington, United States. It was acquired by the city in 1914 and became a park 4 years later. Its namesake is Rupert L. Hamilton, a noted figure in the West Seattle community who helped establish the park. It had previously been known as West Side Park and Duwamish Head Park.

References

External links
Parks Department page on Hamilton Viewpoint
Seattle Viewpoints - Hamilton Park Viewpoint

Parks in Seattle
West Seattle, Seattle